Darran Harris (born 11 November 1992) is a Welsh rugby union player from Brecon, Powys, Wales. He plays for RFU Championship side, Rotherham Titans as a hooker.

Career 
Harris started playing rugby at Brecon RFC as a prop before moving to the youth ranks of Merthyr RFC. During this time, he played for the youth team of the Welsh region of Cardiff Blues. While playing for Cardiff Blues, he was mentored by Dale McIntosh who convinced him to move to Pontypridd RFC in 2011 and changed him from a prop to a hooker. In 2013, he was part of the Pontypridd Welsh Premier Division and WRU Challenge Cup double winning team. The next season, he left the Cardiff Blues region to move to Llanelli RFC which allowed him to play for Scarlets. He made his Scarlets debut in the Anglo-Welsh Cup against Saracens. He also played for Scarlets in the Premiership Sevens tournament. In 2015, Harris left Scarlets and Wales to play in England for RFU Championship Rotherham Titans for development.

When he joined the club, he was tipped to be Rotherham's first choice hooker. After suffering an ankle injury in Rotherham's pre-season, he made his debut for Rotherham in the RFU Championship against Cornish Pirates. After four games of the season, Harris later suffered a shoulder injury that ruled him out of contention for a large part of Rotherham's 2015–16 RFU Championship season.

International career 
In 2012, Harris was called up to the Wales national under-20 rugby union team, where he also played for them in the IRB Junior World Championship in South Africa.

References

External links 
Dragons profile

1992 births
Living people
Rotherham Titans players
Rugby union players from Brecon
Welsh rugby union players
Rugby union hookers